11-Hydroxycannabinol (11-OH-CBN) is the main active metabolite of cannabinol (CBN), one of the active components of cannabis, and has also been isolated from cannabis itself. It is more potent than CBN itself, acting as an agonist of CB1 with around the same potency as THC, but is a weak antagonist at CB2.

See also 
 11-Hydroxyhexahydrocannabinol
 11-Hydroxy-THC
 11-Hydroxy-Delta-8-THC
 Cannabinodiol

References 

Cannabinoids
Benzochromenes